Vergnes is a surname. Notable people with the surname include:

Jacques Vergnes (born 1948), French footballer
Jean Vergnes (1921–2010), French chef